Chagrin Falls is a village in Cuyahoga County, Ohio, United States and is a suburb of Cleveland in Northeast Ohio's Cleveland-Akron-Canton metropolitan area, the 19th-largest Combined Statistical Area nationwide. The village was established and has grown around Chagrin Falls waterfall on the Chagrin River. As of the 2020 census, the village population was 4,327. The village was incorporated in 1844 from parts of three townships in two counties. Neighboring Chagrin Falls Township was established in 1845.

History
Chagrin Falls was laid out in 1837. The community takes its name from a series of waterfalls along the Chagrin River, which runs through the town.

Geography
One notable landmark is the Chagrin Falls waterfall.

Demographics

2010 census
As of the census of 2010, 4,104 people, 1,872 households, and 1,049 families resided in the village. The 2,042 housing units averaged . The racial makeup of the village was 98.0% White, 0.4% African American 0.8% Asian, 0.1% Pacific Islander, 0.1% from other races, and 0.5% from two or more races. Hispanics or Latinos of any race were 0.9% of the population.

Of the 1,872 households, 28.2% had children under the age of 18 living with them, 45.2% were married couples living together, 8.0% had a female householder with no husband present, 2.9% had a male householder with no wife present, and 44.0% were not families. About 39.9% of all households were made up of individuals, and 20.8% had someone living alone who was 65 years of age or older. The average household size was 2.16 and the average family size was 2.94.

The median age in the village was 46.1 years; 23.8% of residents were under the age of 18; 4.3% were between 18 and 24; 20.3% were from 25 to 44; 29% were from 45 to 64; and 22.8% were 65 years of age or older. The gender makeup of the village was 46.2% male and 53.8% female.

2000 census
As of the census of 2000, 4,024 people, 1,862 households, and 1,100 families resided in the village. The population density was 1,943.2 people per square mile (750.6/km). The 2,041 housing units averaged 985.6 per square mile (380.7/km). 

In the village, the population was distributed as 22.2% under age 18, 3.5% from 18 to 24, 27.8% from 25 to 44, 26.9% from 45 to 64, and 19.7% who were 65 years of age or older. The median age was 43 years. For every 100 females, there were 84.8 males. For every 100 females age 18 and over, there were 77.6 males.

The median income for a household in the village was $62,917, and for a family was $90,094. Males had a median income of $69,609 versus $36,319 for females. The per capita income for the village was $42,885. About 2.4% of families and 3.6% of the population were below the poverty line, including 6.3% of those under age 18 and none of those age 65 or over.

Arts and culture
The Chagrin Valley Little Theatre is one of the oldest community theaters in the country, having been in existence since 1930, with the oldest such theater only eight years older.
Leader Tractors were produced in Chagrin Falls. 
The Chagrin Valley Recreation Center hosts one of Northeast Ohio's longest-running annual swim meets each summer. The Chagrin Valley Invitation Relays have been held each summer since 1968.
The town is referenced in the song “Chagrin Falls” by the Canadian rock band The Tragically Hip on their 1998 studio album Phantom Power.
The non-existent Chagrin Falls Country Club was mentioned by the character Ted Mosby, who claimed to have lifeguarded there, in How I Met Your Mother (S5-E11).
Chagrin Falls is the hometown of the character Ensign Charles Parker (Tim Conway) in the 1960s sitcom McHale's Navy.
The 1977 television film The Gathering was filmed in Chagrin Falls.
Chagrin Falls’ downtown is featured on the back cover of the 1988 Calvin and Hobbes collection The Essential Calvin and Hobbes, drawn by Bill Watterson. Chagrin Falls is generally accepted as Calvin's home town.
The famed Popeye comic strip called Chagrin Falls home while it was being drawn by the Hungarian-American Cartoonist, Bela "Bill" Zaboly.
"Chagrin Falls" is the name of a recurring subseries in the comic Tom the Dancing Bug, probably in honor of Bill Watterson.
The fictional town of Angel Falls, Ohio, which is featured in the three-book Angel Falls series by Miranda Liasson, is partly modeled after Chagrin Falls.

Education
Chagrin Falls is in the Chagrin Falls Exempted Village School District, which serves the villages of Chagrin Falls, South Russell, and Bentleyville, and a portion of the village of Moreland Hills.

Chagrin Falls High School is the high school.

Media 
The weekly newspaper Chagrin Valley Times is produced in the town.

Notable people
Addie L. Ballou, 19th-century poet, artist, and suffragist
Ortha O. Barr Jr., attorney
Lisa Banes, actress
Tim Conway, comedic actor
Casey Cott, actor, Kevin Keller on The CW's Riverdale
Corey Cott, Broadway actor
Dane Davis, businessman, economist, and radio personality
Martha Derthick, professor and noted scholar of public administration
Matt DeVries, musician
Wendy Diamond, author and TV personality
Mike Durbin Professional Bowler, 3 time Tournament of Champions Winner
Sonny Geraci, lead singer of The Outsiders and Climax
Doug Kenney, co-founder of National Lampoon and co-writer of Animal House and Caddyshack
Kathleen Kraninger, director of the Consumer Financial Protection Bureau
Bryan Malessa, novelist
Rick Manning, former center fielder of the Cleveland Indians and Milwaukee Brewers
Dave Matthews, saxophonist
Wendy Murray, journalist
Elena Shaddow, Broadway actress, singer
Harry Smith, professional ten-pin bowler and member of the PBA and USBC Halls of Fame
Will Stanton, humor writer
Lee Unkrich, Academy Award-winning film director (Toy Story 3)
Fred van Lente, comic book writer (Action Philosophers!, The Incredible Hercules)
Bill Watterson, creator of Calvin and Hobbes
Ted Wood, former outfielder for San Francisco Giants
Bela "Bill" Zaboly, American cartoonist of the Popeye comic strip from 1938-1959

References

External links

Village of Chagrin Falls official website

Villages in Ohio
Villages in Cuyahoga County, Ohio
Populated places established in 1844
Cleveland metropolitan area
1844 establishments in Ohio